Cipangocharax kiuchii is a species of small tropical land snails with an operculum, terrestrial gastropod mollusks in the family Cyclophoridae.

This species is  endemic to the limestone region of Tokushima-ken, Japan.

References 

Cipangocharax kiuchii n. sp. (Alycaeidae) from Limestone Region of Tokushima-ken, Japan  (in Japanese) ; Minato, Hiroshi.; Abe, Chikaichi., 1982: The Japanese journal of malacology. Venus Tokyo 40(4), p. 200-202

Cipangocharax